Nicolas Bouyssi (born 1972) is a French novelist. A school teacher by profession, Bouyssi has published several books. These include:

 Le Gris, P.O.L, 2007.
 En plein vent, P.O.L, 2008.
 'Compression, P.O.L, 2009.
 Les Algues, P.O.L, 2010.
 S'autodétruire et les enfants, P.O.L, 2011., (reviewed by Le Monde, nominated for the Prix Wepler)
 Esthétique du stéréotype : essai sur Édouard Levé, PUF, 2011.
 Les Rayons du soleil'', P.O.L, 2013. (nominated for the Prix Wepler)

He has also published short stories.

References

1972 births
21st-century French novelists
Living people
French male novelists
21st-century French male writers